For the American singer-songwriter, author, and TV host, see Stacy Dean Campbell.

Stacy Dean is an American policy advisor who is the nominee to serve as under secretary of agriculture for food, nutrition, and consumer services.

Education 
Dean earned a Bachelor of Arts and Master of Public Policy from the University of Michigan.

Career 
From 1992 to 1997, Dean served as a budget analyst in the Office of Management and Budget. She joined the Center on Budget and Policy Priorities in 1997, working as a senior policy analyst until 2000 and vice president for food assistance policy until 2021.

On January 21, 2021, Dean began service in the Biden administration as deputy under secretary for food, nutrition, and consumer services at the Department of Agriculture. On May 13, 2022, President Biden nominated her to the under secretary position in the same office.

References 

Living people
Year of birth missing (living people)
University of Michigan alumni
Biden administration personnel
United States Department of Agriculture officials